Ups N' Downs is a 1931 Looney Tunes cartoon featuring Bosko. It was released in April 1931 and is directed by Hugh Harman and Rudolf Ising. The film score was written by Frank Marsales.

Plot
Bosko is working as a hot dog salesman at a fair, and is determined to win the fair's race with his self-built mechanical horse. Despite fierce competition from riders and their legislate horses, along with the efforts of a cheating jockey who uses his spit and even a hand grenade to hinder Bosko, Bosko crosses the finish line using his horse's extendable neck and is crowned the winner of the race.

Alternate version and ending
When the cartoon was re-released by pirate distributor Astra TV in the 1950s, it was renamed Off to the Races and had a cut ending. The 1973 redrawn colorized version was sourced from an incomplete copy, and thus has a significantly different ending: the hand grenade destroys Bosko's mechanical horse, but also sends him flying into the cheating jockey and knocks him off his own horse, which Bosko is then able to use to win the race.

References

External links
 
 

1931 films
1931 animated films
1930s American animated films
1930s animated short films
Films scored by Frank Marsales
Films directed by Hugh Harman
Films directed by Rudolf Ising
Bosko films
Looney Tunes shorts
American black-and-white films